Arriva Kent Thameside is a bus operator based in North-West Kent, England. It is a subsidiary of Arriva. The company operates services in Northfleet, Gravesend & Dartford as part of the Arriva Southern Counties division from their Northfleet depot.

Depot and Services

Northfleet Depot
Northfleet depot runs a mixture of commercial and tendered services in Dartford, Gravesend and surrounding areas.

Bus Services
Northfleet currently operate the following bus services:

ArrivaClick

Northfleet also run the ArrivaClick demand responsive service which covers Darent Valley Hospital, Bluewater, Swanscombe and Ebbsfleet Valley.

Fleet
As of January 2023, the Arriva Kent Thameside fleet consists of approximately 56 vehicles.

The fleet consists mainly of Wright Streetlite, VDL SB200 Wright Commander, Dennis Dart Plaxton Pointer, Dennis Dart Caetano Nimbus, Alexander Dennis Enviro200, Alexander Dennis Enviro200 MMC and Wright Eclipse Gemini buses.

Livery

Corporate Livery

The current Arriva corporate livery is light blue across the whole of the vehicle with a pale blue and white stripe at the front of the bus.

This is currently replacing the previous corporate livery which was aquamarine with a cream "cow-horn" at the front with a dark blue skirt. This livery can still be found on many older Arriva Kent Thameside vehicles.

Sapphire Livery

The current Arriva Sapphire livery uses the same light blue colour across the majority of the bus although the front of the bus is dark blue with a white and silver stripe separating the two colours. Arriva Kent Thameside operate Sapphire liveried buses on routes 480 and 490 which contain branding for the two services.

Fastrack

As well as the corporate and Sapphire liveries, the buses used on the Fastrack routes A and B have their own specialist livery.

The buses use a purple base livery with a light and dark blue shimmer effect towards the rear with the Fastrack logo on the front, sides and rear of the bus.

The Fastrack services replaced route 100. The buses on this route used the specialist Bluewater livery in March 1999. This was allover blue, with a water shimmer effect. The service using this livery were replaced by Fastrack on 26 March 2006.

See also
List of bus operators of the United Kingdom

References
References

Notes

External links

 Arriva Bus UK website

Kent Thameside
Transport in Kent